The Auster A.2/45 was a British late 1940s single-engined high-wing air observation monoplane built by Auster Aircraft Limited at Rearsby, Leicestershire. It was designed and built to meet Air Ministry Specification A.2/45 for an "Air Observation Post" (AOP) for the British Army, the requirement was withdrawn and only two prototypes were built.

Design and development
The Auster Model N normally known by the specification number as the A.2/45 was a strut-braced high-wing monoplane with a single DH Gipsy Queen engine, the enclosed cabin had room for a pilot and observer seated in tandem. It had a conventional landing gear with a tail wheel.

The British Air Ministry Specification A.2/45 was issued on 20 July 1945 for an Air Observation Aircraft to meet Operational Requirement OR.176 in particularly for operation from unprepared landing grounds. Contracts for four prototypes from both Auster and the Heston Aircraft Company were placed on 21 August 1945, this was later reduced to just two aircraft from each company. The Heston competitor for the specification was the Heston JC.6.

The first prototype Auster A.2/45 VL522 flew on 27 April 1948. The Air Ministry requirement was cancelled on the 20 March 1950 and only the two prototypes were built.

Specifications

See also
 Heston A.2/45 designed to the same Air Ministry Specification

References

Auster aircraft
High-wing aircraft
Single-engined tractor aircraft
1940s British military reconnaissance aircraft
Aircraft first flown in 1948